Fezzan refers to:

 Fezzan (region), a historic region of Libya
 Fezzan Basin
 Fezzan-Ghadames Military Territory
 Fezzan valleys
 Fezzan province